Khaya is a genus of five tree species in the mahogany family Meliaceae. The timber of Khaya is called African mahogany, and is valued as a substitute to American mahogany (of the genus Swietenia).

Description

The genus is native to tropical Africa and Madagascar. All species grow to around 30–35m tall, rarely 45m, with a trunk over 1m diameter, often buttressed at the base. 

The leaves are pinnate, with 4-6 pairs of leaflets, the terminal leaflet absent; each leaflet is 10–15 cm long abruptly rounded toward the apex but often with an acuminate tip. The leaves can be either deciduous or evergreen depending on the species. The flowers are produced in loose inflorescences, each flower small, with four or five yellowish petals and ten stamens. The fruit is a globose four or five-valved capsule 5–8 cm diameter, containing numerous winged seeds.

Species
Khaya anthotheca (syn. K. nyasica)
Khaya grandifoliola
Khaya ivorensis
Khaya madagascariensis
Khaya senegalensis

Uses
The timber of Khaya is called "African mahogany", with wood properties generally regarded as the closest to genuine mahogany.

The seeds of K. senegalensis have an oil content of 52.5%, consisting of 21% palmitic acid, 10% stearic acid, 65% oleic acid, and 4% "unidentifiable acid"

The durable reddish-brown wood of K. anthotheca is used for dug-out canoes or makoros and as a general beam, door frame and shelving timber which is termite and borer resistant.

References

 
Meliaceae genera